Tubli Bay (also known as the Gulf of Tubli) is a bay in the east of Bahrain, between Bahrain Island and Sitra island. The body of water is directly south of the Manama peninsula. The island of Nabih Saleh lies in the bay.

The area was known for its rich marine and bird life, and the mangrove forests around its borders. The mangroves thrived on the run-off of water of freshwater springs after it passed through farms into the bay. The bay is a major breeding ground for shrimp and fishes. It is also a stopover for several migratory bird species.

Today Tubli Bay has suffered from illegal land reclamation, environmental pollution and decreasing freshwater supply from springs. Land reclamation has reduced the size from 25 km2 in the 1960s to just 11 km2 today. The mangroves that used to exist along much of the coast have been reduced to just a few small patches at Ras Sanad and Ras Tubli.

In 1997, Tubli Bay was added to the list of Ramsar wetlands of international importance.

References

External links
 Conservation in Bahrain
 Tubli Bay 'a lost heritage', Gulf Daily News, 25 March 2007
 Bridge project 'blow to Tubli Bay' , Gulf Daily News, 14 April 2008
 Tubli bay 2010 (video report)

Bodies of water of Bahrain
Ramsar sites in Bahrain
Bays of the Indian Ocean